The AN/MRN-3 was a marker beacon set used by the Army Air Force during and after World War II, it was standardized 23 October 1943, and replaced SCR-241.

Use
Each system requires three marker beacon sets, one to be located in the airport runway boundary, one at approximately one mile from the approach end of the runway, and one 4.5 miles from the approach end of the runway, all on the center line of the runway to be used. The equipment transmits a vertical pattern to be received by the RC-43, RC-193, or AN/ARN-8, AN/ARN-12. A signal, amplitude modulated at 1,300 cycles per second, may be keyed at two dashes per second, six dots per second, or may be unkeyed. The marker beacon transmitter projects a vertical fan-shaped pattern to a height of approximately 3,000 feet. The transmitter is placed so that the longer horizontal axis is perpendicular to the line of approach.

Components

The beacon set is mounted in a jeep (Willys MB) and consists of
 RC-115 transmitter (BC-902-B)
 PE-88 generator or PE-214 generator
 an SCR-610 is provided for ground communications

Aircraft components
The RC-43-A (BC-357) is a UHF receiver which provides a visual indication when flying over a 75-MHz marker beacon. it operates in the frequency of 67 to 80 MHz. The receiver box is located with other radio equipment and lights a lamp on the pilot's instrument panel when over the beacon. the RC-43 is 24 volts, the RC-39 is 12 volts. the unit uses a fixed wire antenna.
The RC-193-A (BC-1033) is the same, but a post-war version.

See also
 AN/CRN-2
 AN/MRN-1
 Instrument landing system
 List of military electronics of the United States
 List of U.S. Signal Corps vehicles
 LORAN
 Radio navigation
 SCR-277
 SHORAN
 Signal Corps Radio

References

 TM 11-227 Signal Communication Directory. dated 10 April 1944
 TM 11-487 Electrical Communication systems Equipment. dated 2 October 1944
 Graphic Survey of Radio and Radar Equipment Used by the Army Airforce. section 3 Radio Navigation Equipment Dated May 1945

Further reading

External links
 http://aafcollection.info/items/documents/view.php?file=000149-01-03.pdf TO 30-100F-1 1943
 http://www.designation-systems.net/usmilav/jetds/an-c.html
 https://web.archive.org/web/20080828215101/http://jptronics.org/radios/Military/JANAP161/an.ac/an.arc-type.rc-103.pdf data sheet

Military radio systems of the United States
Equipment of the United States Air Force
World War II American electronics
Military communications
Military equipment introduced from 1940 to 1944